August Edmun "Augie" Garrido Jr. (February 6, 1939 – March 15, 2018) was an American professional baseball player and coach in NCAA Division I college baseball, best known for his stints with the Cal State Fullerton Titans and Texas Longhorns.

Garrido compiled a collegiate record of 1,975–951–9 and retired in 2016 as the coach with, at the time, the most wins in college baseball history. His win total was surpassed by Mike Martin of the Florida State Seminoles in 2018. He took his programs to 15 College World Series, winning five of them: three with Cal State Fullerton and two with Texas.

He is often considered to be arguably the greatest coach in college baseball history.

Early life and education
Garrido was born in Vallejo, California in 1939 and graduated from Vallejo High School in 1957. From 1959 to 1961, Garrido played college baseball for Fresno State. Garrido played minor league baseball in the Cleveland Indians organization from 1961 to 1965, beginning with the Class B Burlington Indians from 1961 to 1962, followed by the double-A Charleston Indians in 1963 and triple-A Portland Beavers from 1964 to 1965.

After playing for the semi-pro Eureka-Humboldt Crabs in 1966, with Mark Marquess among his teammates, Garrido began graduate studies at California Polytechnic State University, San Luis Obispo (Cal Poly) and graduated in 1968 with a master's degree in education. During his graduate studies, Garrido coached baseball at Sierra High School in Tollhouse, California in 1967 and 1968.

Coaching career

San Francisco State (1969)
In 1969, Garrido began his coaching career as head coach at San Francisco State, where he led the Gators to a 25–14 record.

Cal Poly (1970–1972)
Returning to Cal Poly, Garrido was head coach for the Cal Poly Mustangs from 1970 to 1972, during which he went 86–62–1. He turned around the Mustangs from a 16–33 record in 1970 to 39–11–1 in 1971.

Cal State Fullerton (1973–1987 and 1991–1996)
From 1973 to 1987 and again from 1991 to 1996, Garrido was head coach at Cal State Fullerton. In 21 seasons with Cal State Fullerton, Garrido accumulated a 929–391–6 record with seven College World Series including three championships (1979, 1984, and 1995) and a runner-up finish in 1992. The Sporting News named Garrido the College Baseball Coach of the Year in 1975 and 1979.

Illinois (1988–1990)
In between his two stints at Cal State Fullerton, Garrido was head coach at Illinois from 1988 to 1990. Illinois athletic director Neale Stoner signed Garrido to a salary nearly double that of other non-revenue sports' coaches at Illinois.

In 1989, Illinois got its first Big Ten Tournament title and NCAA Tournament appearance since 1963 and repeated both achievements in 1990. Illinois went 111–57 under Garrido.

Texas (1997–2016)
Garrido led Texas to the College World Series four straight years from 2002 to 2005 and won the tournament in 2002 and 2005. In 2006, despite being ranked No. 3 in the nation at the end of the regular season, Texas was defeated at home in an NCAA regional by Stanford.

On April 29, 2011, Garrido became the first NCAA Division I coach to reach 1,800 victories as the seventh-ranked Longhorns defeated No. 14 Oklahoma 5–0 in front of 7,339 fans at UFCU Disch–Falk Field.

In 2016, Texas had its first losing season since 1998, and the team did not qualify for postseason play for the third time in five years. On May 30, 2016, the University of Texas announced that Garrido had resigned and accepted a position as a special assistant to the athletic director, Mike Perrin. His record at Texas was 824–427–2.

Legacy
Garrido's teams won five national titles (1979, 1984, 1995, 2002, 2005). He is one of only two coaches, along with Andy Lopez, to lead teams from more than one school (Cal State Fullerton and Texas) to national titles, and is among the most successful college baseball coaches in history. He is the first coach to guide teams to national championships in four different decades.

Additionally, Garrido earned 15 trips to the College World Series, including eight at Texas, while garnering National Coach of the Year honors five times (1975, 1979, 1984, 1985, 2002), regional coach of the year accolades following six different seasons (1975, 1979, 1984, 1985, 2002, 2004) and conference coach of the year distinctions on three occasions (1987, 1995, 2002). Garrido's teams won league championships in 20 different seasons.

His final coaching record was 1,975–951–9. He earned more wins than any other coach in NCAA baseball history, across all levels, prior to being surpassed by Florida State University's Mike Martin in 2018.

Personal life
Garrido was a friend of actor Kevin Costner from Garrido's days at CSUF (where Costner attended and was cut from the baseball team by Garrido). Costner, who maintains a home in Austin, was occasionally seen at Garrido's practices and games. Garrido played the New York Yankees manager in Costner's movie "For Love of the Game."

Garrido was a friend of director Richard Linklater, a Longhorn fan. Linklater was often seen taking batting practice with the team while in Austin. In 2008, ESPN2 aired a 2-hour documentary directed by Linklater, titled "Inning By Inning: Portrait of A Coach", which focused on the life of Garrido, from his childhood to his current job at The University of Texas.

American storyteller and adventurer Woodrow Landfair was a player of Garrido's at the University of Texas from 2003 to 2005, serving as the team's bullpen catcher and winning back-to-back Teammate of the Year awards in 2004 and 2005. In a 2007 article in the Austin American-Statesman, Landfair was quoted praising Garrido as both a baseball and a life coach. Landfair claims that Garrido inspired him to pursue a writing career when, after Landfair accepted the team's 2005 National Championship trophy, Garrido told him, "Let this be only your first great accomplishment."Austin American-Statesman.

On January 17, 2009, Garrido was arrested by Austin police for driving while intoxicated. Police reported that Garrido was driving a Porsche Cayenne west on 6th Street at about 1:00 a.m., when a DWI enforcement officer pulled the coach over since he did not have his headlights on. After taking a sobriety test, Garrido admitted to the officer that he consumed five glasses of wine and was intoxicated. The school suspended him with pay from the first four games of the Longhorns' 2009 season. Garrido publicly apologized, calling his misdemeanor a "serious mistake".  He pleaded guilty to the charge on February 2, 2009, and was sentenced on April 30, 2009.

Garrido was a friend of former President George W. Bush from the time Bush was a part owner of the Texas Rangers baseball team.

Garrido's curse-laden post game rants became the subject of several YouTube videos.

On March 12, 2018, Garrido suffered a stroke.  Three days later, he died at the age of 79 in California.

Head coaching record
The following is a table of Garrido's win–loss records as an NCAA head baseball coach.

See also
 List of college baseball coaches with 1,100 wins

References

External links
 Texas profile
 

1939 births
2018 deaths
Baseball players from California
Burlington Indians players (1958–1964)
Cal Poly Mustangs baseball coaches
Cal State Fullerton Titans baseball coaches
Charleston Indians players
Fresno State Bulldogs baseball players
High school baseball coaches in the United States
Illinois Fighting Illini baseball coaches
National College Baseball Hall of Fame inductees
Portland Beavers players
San Francisco State Gators baseball coaches
Sportspeople from Vallejo, California
Texas Longhorns baseball coaches